Kiss My Grass: A Hillbilly Tribute to Kiss is the third album by American band Hayseed Dixie, released in 2003 (see 2003 in music).  The album consists entirely of covers of songs by the hard rock band Kiss performed in the bluegrass style.

Track listing
"Calling Dr. Love" (Gene Simmons) – 2:54
"Detroit Rock City" (Bob Ezrin, Paul Stanley) – 4:10
"Christine Sixteen" (Simmons) – 3:10
"Cold Gin" (Ace Frehley) – 3:53
"Let's Put the X in Sex" (Desmond Child, Stanley) – 3:22
"Love Gun" (Stanley) – 3:25
"Lick It Up" (Vinnie Vincent, Stanley) – 3:16
"I Love It Loud" (Vincent, Simmons) – 3:34
"Rock and Roll All Nite" (Simmons, Stanley) – 2:49
"Heaven's on Fire" (Child, Stanley) – 3:58

Charts
Album - Billboard (United States)

References 

Dualtone Records albums
Hayseed Dixie albums
2003 albums
Kiss (band) tribute albums